Joel Naom Hirschhorn is an American human geneticist, pediatrician, and endocrinologist. He is known for his research on the genetics of complex human traits, such as height.

Early life, family and education
Hirschhorn is the son of Kurt and Rochelle Hirschhorn, both human geneticists.

Joel attended Stuyvesant High School in New York City. He then attended Harvard College, where he received his A.B. in biochemistry before receiving his Ph.D. and M.D. from Harvard Medical School. He did his Ph.D. research on chromatin structure and transcription in yeast with Fred Winston. After receiving his Ph.D., he did his postdoc on genetic association studies at the Whitehead Institute's Center for Genome Research with Eric Lander.

Career
He is an institute member of the Broad Institute, as well as the Concordia Professor of Pediatrics and Professor of Genetics at Boston Children’s Hospital and Harvard Medical School. He has had his own laboratory at Boston Children's Hospital since 2001. He became the Chief of the Division of Endocrinology at Boston Children's Hospital in 2018. 

Additionally, he heads the GIANT consortium.

In 2006, Hirschhorn was elected to the American Society for Clinical Investigation. In 2011, he received the Society for Pediatric Research's E. Mead Johnson Award. In 2020, he was elected to the National Academy of Medicine.

References

External links
Faculty page

American geneticists
Living people
Human geneticists
Harvard Medical School alumni
Harvard Medical School faculty
American endocrinologists
American pediatricians
Harvard College alumni
Stuyvesant High School alumni
Year of birth missing (living people)
Members of the American Society for Clinical Investigation
Members of the National Academy of Medicine